Szymon Marciniak (born 7 January 1981) is a Polish professional football referee. He is considered one of the most highly rated international referees of his generation. He refereed the 2022 FIFA World Cup final between Argentina and France on 18 December 2022 in Lusail, Qatar, as well as the 2018 UEFA Super Cup between Real Madrid and Atlético Madrid. In 2023, he was named "The World's Best Referee" by the International Federation of Football History & Statistics (IFFHS).

Early career
Marciniak was born in 1981 in Płock, Poland. The first sport he practiced in his youth was cycling. He changed this sport for football at the age of 15. He played in the junior squad of Wisła Płock claiming the fourth place at the Polish Junior Championships with the team. He also briefly played for the German Regionalliga club  VfB Annaberg-Buchholz. He began his career as a football referee at the age of 21. Initially, he combined refereeing football matches with playing as an amateur footballer. In 2006, he switched to working as a football referee professionally.

He refereed his first match in the top Polish professional league in 2009 at the GKS Bełchatów stadium (match between GKS Bełchatów and Odra Wodzisław Śląski). Since then, he has refereed more than 300 matches in Ekstraklasa having been appointed the head referee in the 2016 Polish Cup final match as well as the 2017 Polish SuperCup.

As of 2021, he has given 1212 yellow cards (on average four yellow cards per game), 79 red cards and has awarded 131 penalty kicks in over 300 Ekstraklasa matches he has refereed.

International career
Marciniak became a FIFA referee in 2011. The same year, he also debuted as a referee in the Europa League in the qualifying match between Aalesunds FK and Ferencvárosi TC. In 2012, he refereed his first match in the UEFA Champions League between FK Ventspils and Molde FK. He refereed at 2014 FIFA World Cup qualifiers, beginning with the Group F match between Portugal and Azerbaijan.

On 20 March 2015, he was appointed to the UEFA Elite referee list, finding himself among the top 27 football referees in Europe. On 30 June 2015, he was the referee for the 2015 UEFA European Under-21 Championship Final.

In March 2016, he refereed his first match in the knockout phase of the Champions League, a Round of 16 match between Real Madrid and AS Roma. One month later, he officiated the quarterfinal between Bayern Munich and S.L. Benfica.

He participated in the UEFA Euro 2016 and refereed three matches: Spain-Czech Republic and Iceland-Austria in the group stage of the tournament as well as Germany-Slovakia in the knockout phase.

On 29 March 2018, FIFA announced that he would officiate some matches at 2018 FIFA World Cup along with Pawel Sokolnicki and Tomasz Listkiewicz as assistant referees. He officiated two group stage matches: Argentina-Iceland and Germany-Sweden. He was also selected as the referee for the 2018 UEFA Super Cup final match between Real Madrid and Atlético Madrid.

On 15 December 2021, he was appointed to referee of the semi-final match between Qatar and Algeria (1-2) at the 2021 FIFA Arab Cup hosted by Qatar.

On 19 May 2022, he was selected to officiate matches at the FIFA World Cup 2022. He officiated one match in the group stage (France's 2-1 win over Denmark) and one match in the Round of 16 (Argentina's 2-1 victory over Australia). On 15 December 2022, it was announced that he would officiate the World Cup Final between Argentina and France, becoming the first Polish referee to do so. His performance in the final was highly praised by many commentators as well as fellow referees including Pierluigi Collina, Howard Webb, Keith Hackett, Lutz Wagner and Thorsten Kinhöfer.

Personal life
He has two children with wife Magdalena: a son Bartosz (born 2003) and a daughter Natalia (born 2012). He practices Muay Thai as an amateur.

In 2021, he was diagnosed with tachycardia after having recovered from COVID-19 infection, which prevented him from officiating matches at the UEFA Euro 2020.

Record

Major national team competition

Other matches

See also
List of FIFA international referees
Sport in Poland

References

 Szymon Marciniak

 

1981 births
Living people
Polish football referees
Sportspeople from Płock
UEFA Champions League referees
UEFA Euro 2016 referees
FIFA World Cup referees
2018 FIFA World Cup referees
2022 FIFA World Cup referees
FIFA World Cup Final match officials